The Men's Marathon at the 2001 World Championships in Edmonton, Alberta in Canada was held on August 3, 2001.

Medalists

Abbreviations
All times shown are in hours:minutes:seconds

Records

Intermediates

Final ranking

See also
 2000 Summer Olympics (Sydney)
 2001 Marathon Year Ranking
 2001 World Marathon Cup

References
 Results
 IAAF
 Results - World Athletics

M
Marathons at the World Athletics Championships
2001 marathons
Men's marathons
Marathons in Canada